Nazism and the acts of Nazi Germany affected many countries, communities, and people before, during and after World War II. Nazi Germany's attempt to exterminate several groups viewed as subhuman by Nazi ideology was eventually stopped by the combined efforts of the wartime Allies headed by United Kingdom, the Soviet Union, and the United States.

Jewish people

Of the world's 18 million Jews in 1939, more than a third were murdered in the Holocaust. Of the three million Jews in Poland, the heartland of European Jewish culture, fewer than 60,000 survived. Most of the remaining Jews in Eastern and Central Europe became refugees, unable or unwilling to return to countries that became Soviet puppet states or countries that had betrayed them to the Nazis.

Poland

The Nazis intended to destroy the Polish nation completely. In 1941, the Nazi leadership decided that Poland was to be fully cleared of ethnic Poles within 10 to 20 years and settled by German colonists to further their policy of Lebensraum. From the beginning of the occupation, Germany's policy was to plunder and exploit Polish territory, turning it into a giant concentration camp for Poles who were to be exterminated as "Untermenschen". The policy of plunder and exploitation inflicted material losses to Polish industry, agriculture, infrastructure and cultural landmarks, with the cost of the destruction by Germans alone estimated at approximately €525 billion or $640 billion. Remaining Polish industry was mostly destroyed or transported to Russia by Soviet forces after the war.

The official Polish government report of war losses prepared in 1947 reported 6,028,000 war victims out of a population of 27,007,000 ethnic Poles and Jews alone. For political reasons, the report excluded the losses to the Soviet Union and the losses among Polish citizens of Ukrainian and Belarusian origin.

Poland's eastern border was significantly moved westwards to the Curzon Line. The resulting territorial loss of 188,000 km2 (formerly populated by 5.3 million ethnic Poles) was to be compensated by the addition of 111,000 km2 of former German territory east of the Oder–Neisse line (formerly populated by 11.4 million ethnic Germans). Kidnapping of Polish children by Germany also took place, in which children who were believed to hold German blood were taken away; around 20,000 Polish children were taken away from their parents. Out of the abducted only 10–15% returned home. Polish elites were decimated and over half of the Polish intelligentsia were murdered. Some professions lost 20–50% of their members, for example 58% of Polish lawyers, 38% of medical doctors and 28% of university workers were exterminated by the Nazis. The Polish capital Warsaw was razed by German forces and most of its old and newly acquired cities lay in ruins (e.g. Wrocław) or lost to the Soviet Union (e.g. Lwów). In addition Poland became a Soviet satellite state, remaining under a Soviet-controlled communist government until 1989. Russian troops did not withdraw from Poland until 1993, after the collapse of the Soviet Union in 1991.

See also
Nazi crimes against the Polish nation
Expulsion of Poles by Germany
Generalplan Ost
German AB-Aktion in Poland
Holocaust in Poland
Operation Tannenberg
Intelligenzaktion
Chronicles of Terror

Central Europe

As a consequence of the war and Soviet occupation, Central European countries found themselves under the "Soviet sphere of influence" (as agreed upon at the Yalta Conference).  Immediately following the war, Soviet style socialist governments were established in all of these countries and any forms of western style democracy that existed before the war were abolished. As a result of the Warsaw Pact not participating in the Marshall Plan, as well as industrial infrastructure being taken by the Soviets, economic recovery was slowed significantly.

Soviet Union
About 26 million Soviet citizens perished as a result of the Nazi invasion of the Soviet Union, including around 10,651,000 soldiers who died in battle against Hitler's armies or died in POW camps. According to Russian historian Vadim Erlikman, Soviet losses amounted to 26.5 million war related deaths. Millions of civilians also died from starvation, exposure, atrocities, and massacres, and a huge area of the Soviet Union from the suburbs of Moscow and the Volga River to the western border had been destroyed, depopulated, and reduced to rubble. The mass death and destruction there badly damaged the Soviet economy, society, and national psyche.  The death toll included c.a. 1.5 million Soviet Jews killed by the German invaders. The mass destruction and mass murder was one of the reasons why the Soviet Union installed satellite states in Central Europe; as the government hoped to use the countries as a buffer zone against any new invasions from the West. This helped break down the wartime alliance between the Soviet Union and the Western Allies, setting the stage for the Cold War, which lasted until 1989, two years before the dissolution of the Soviet Union in 1991. Soviet culture in the 1950s was defined by results of the Great Patriotic War.

Close to 60% of the European war dead were from the Soviet Union. Military losses of 10.6 million include 7.6 million killed or missing in action and 2.6 million POW dead, plus 400,000 paramilitary and Soviet partisan losses. Civilian deaths totaled 15.9 million which included 1.5 million from military actions. 7.1 million victims of Nazi genocide and reprisals; 1.8 million deported to Germany for forced labor; and 5.5 million famine and disease deaths. Additional famine deaths which totaled 1 million during 1946–47 are not included here. These losses are for the entire territory of the USSR including territories annexed in 1939–40.

To the north, the Germans reached Leningrad (Saint Petersburg) in August 1941. The city was surrounded on 8 September, beginning a 900-day siege during which about 1.2 million citizens perished.

Of the 5.7 million Soviet prisoners of war captured by the Germans, more than 3.5 million had died while in German captivity by the end of the war. On 11 February 1945, at the conclusion of the Yalta Conference, the United States and United Kingdom signed a Repatriation Agreement with the USSR. The interpretation of this Agreement resulted in the forcible repatriation of all Soviets regardless of their wishes. Millions of Soviet POWs and forced laborers transported to Germany are believed to have been treated as traitors, cowards and deserters on their return to the USSR (see Order No. 270). Statistical data from Soviet archives, that became available after Perestroika, attest that the overall increase of the Gulag population was minimal during 1945–46 and only 272,867 of repatriated Soviet POWs and civilians (out of 4,199,488) were imprisoned.

Belarus
Belarus lost a quarter of its pre-war population, including almost all of its intellectual elite, and 90% of the country’s Jewish population. Following bloody encirclement battles, all of the present-day Belarus territory was occupied by the Germans by the end of August 1941. The Nazis imposed a brutal regime, deporting some 380,000 young people for slave labour, and killing hundreds of thousands of other civilians. At least 5,295 Belarusian settlements were destroyed by the Nazis and some or all their inhabitants killed (out of 9,200 settlements that were burned or otherwise destroyed in Belarus during World War II). More than 600 villages like Khatyn were burned with their entire population. More than 209 cities and towns (out of 270 total) were destroyed. Himmler had pronounced a plan according to which 3/4 of Belarusian population was designated for "eradication" and 1/4 of racially cleaner population (blue eyes, light hair) would be allowed to serve Germans as slaves (Ostarbeiter).

Some recent estimates raise the number of Belarusians who perished in War to "3 million 650 thousand people, unlike the former 2.2 million. That is to say not every fourth inhabitant but about 40% of the pre-war Belarusian population perished (considering the present-day borders of Belarus)." This compares to 15% of Poland's post war borders and 19% of Ukrainian population in post war border and comparing to 2% of Czechoslovakian population that perished in post war borders.

Ukraine
Estimates on population losses in Ukraine range from 7 to 11 million. More than 700 cities and towns and 28,000 villages were destroyed.

See also
Forced settlements in the Soviet Union
Generalplan Ost
Hunger Plan
Occupation of Belarus by Nazi Germany
Operation Keelhaul
World War II casualties

Yugoslavia

It is estimated that 1,700,000 people were killed during World War II in Yugoslavia from 1941 to 1945. Very high losses were among Serbs who lived in Bosnia and Croatia, as well as Jewish and Romani minorities, with losses also high among all other non-collaborating populations. In the summer of 1941, the Serbian uprising came at the time of the German invasion of the USSR. The Nazi response was the execution of 100 Serbian civilians for every killed soldier and 50 Serbian civilians for every wounded soldier. The Yugoslav Partisans fought both a guerrilla campaign against the Axis occupiers and a civil war against the Chetniks. The Independent State of Croatia was established as a Nazi puppet-state, ruled by the fascist militia known as the Ustaše. During this time the Independent State of Croatia created extermination camps for anti-fascists, communists, Serbs, Muslims, Romanies and Jews, one of the most infamous being the Jasenovac concentration camp. A large number of men, women and children, mostly Serbs, were murdered in these camps.

Western Europe

Britain and France, two of the victors, were exhausted and bankrupted by the war, and Britain lost its superpower status. With Germany and Japan in ruins as well, the world was left with two dominant powers, the United States and the Soviet Union. Economic and political reality in Western Europe would soon force the dismantling of the European colonial empires, especially in Africa and Asia.

One of the most important political consequences of the Nazi experience in Western Europe was the establishment of new political alliances which eventually became the European Union and an international military alliance of European countries known as NATO to counterbalance the Soviets' Warsaw Pact and until communist rule in Eastern Europe ended in the late 1980s.

The Communists emerged from the war sharing the vast prestige of the victorious Soviet armed forces, and for a while it looked as though they might take power in France, Italy and Greece. The West quickly acted to prevent this from happening, hence the Cold War.

Greece

In Greece, the German occupation (April 1941 – October 1944) destroyed the economy through war reparations, plundering of the country's resources and hyper-inflation. In addition, the Germans left most of the country's infrastructure in ruins as they withdrew in 1944. As a result of an Allied blockade and German indifference to local needs, the first winter of the occupation was marked by widespread famine in the main urban centres, with as many as 300,000 civilians dead from starvation. Although these levels of starvation were not repeated in the following years, malnourishment was common throughout the occupation. In addition, thousands more were executed by German forces as reprisals for partisan activities. As part of the Holocaust, Greece's Jewish community was almost wiped out, especially the large Sephardi community of Thessaloniki, which had earned the city the sobriquet "Mother of Israel" and had first settled there in the early 16th century at the invitation of the then-ruling Ottoman Empire. In total, at least 81% (ca. 60,000) of Greece's total pre-war Jewish population was murdered.

The bitterest and longest-lasting legacy of the German occupation was the social upheaval it wrought. The old political elites were sidelined, and the Resistance against the Axis brought to the fore the leftist National Liberation Front (EAM), arguably the country's first true mass-movement, where the Communists played a central role. In an effort to oppose its growing influence, the Germans encouraged the pre-war conservative establishment to confront it, and allowed the creation of armed units. As elsewhere in Eastern Europe, in the last year of the occupation, conditions in Greece often approximated a civil war between EAM and other powers. The rift would become permanent in December 1944, when EAM and the British-backed government clashed in Athens, and again in a fully fledged civil war from 1946–1949.

Germany

More than 8 million Germans, including almost 2 million civilians, died during World War II (see World War II casualties). After the end of the war in Europe additional casualties were incurred during the Allied occupation and also during the population expulsions that followed.

After the war, the German people were often viewed with contempt because they were blamed by other Europeans for Nazi crimes. Germans visiting abroad, particularly in the 1950s and 1960s, attracted insults from locals, and from foreigners who may have lost their families or friends in the atrocities. Today in Europe and worldwide (particularly in countries that fought against the Axis), Germans may be scorned by elderly people who were alive to experience the atrocities committed by Nazi Germans during World War II. This resulted in a feeling of controversy for many Germans, causing numerous discussions and rows among scholars and politicians in Post-War West Germany (for example, the "Historikerstreit" [historians' argument] in the 1980s) and after Reunification. Here, the discussion was mainly about the role that the unified Germany should play in the world and in Europe. Bernard Schlink's novel The Reader concerns how post-war Germans dealt with the issue.

Following World War II, the Allies embarked on a program of denazification, but as the Cold War intensified these efforts were curtailed in the west.

Germany itself and the German economy were devastated, with great parts of most major cities destroyed by the bombings of the Allied forces, sovereignty taken away by the Allies and the territory filled with millions of refugees from the former eastern provinces which the Allies had decided were to be annexed by the Soviet Union and Poland, moving the eastern German border westwards to the Oder-Neisse line and effectively reducing Germany in size by roughly 25% (see also Potsdam Conference). The remaining parts of Germany were divided among the Allies and occupied by British (the north-west), French (the south-west), American (the south) and Soviet (the east) troops.

The expulsions of Germans from the lost areas in the east (see also Former eastern territories of Germany), the Sudetenland, and elsewhere in eastern Europe went on for several years. The number of Germans expelees totaled roughly 15,000,000. Estimates of number of deaths in connection with expulsion range from under 500,000 to 3 million.

After a short time, the Allies broke over ideological problems (Communism versus Capitalism), and thus both sides established their own spheres of influence, creating a previously non-existent division in Germany between East and West (although the division largely followed the borders of states which had existed in Germany before Bismarck's unification less than 100 years before).

A constitution for East Germany was drafted on 30 May 1949. Wilhelm Pieck, a leader of the Socialist Unity Party of Germany (SED) party (which was created by a forced merger of the Social Democratic Party of Germany (SPD) and Communist Party of Germany (KPD) in the Soviet sector), was elected first President of the German Democratic Republic.

West Germany, officially the Federal Republic of Germany (FRG), received de facto semi-sovereignty in 1949, as well as a constitution, called the Grundgesetz (Basic Law). The document was not called a Constitution officially, as at this point, it was still hoped that the two German states would be reunited in the near future.

The first free elections in West Germany were held in 1949, which were won by the Christian Democratic Party of Germany (CDU) (conservatives) by a slight margin. Konrad Adenauer, a member of the CDU, was the first Bundeskanzler (Chancellor) of West Germany.

Both German states introduced, in 1948, their own money, colloquially called West-Mark and Ost-Mark (Western Mark and Eastern Mark).

Foreign troops still remain in Germany today, for example Ramstein Air Base, but the majority of troops left following the end of the Cold War (By 1994 for Soviet troops, mandated under the terms of the Treaty on the Final Settlement With Respect to Germany and in the mid-1990s for Western forces). The Bush Administration in the United States in 2004 stated intentions to withdraw most of the remaining American troops out of Germany in the coming years. During the years 1950–2000 more than 10,000,000 U.S. military personnel were stationed in Germany.

The West German economy was by the mid 1950s rebuilt thanks to the abandonment in mid-1947 of some of the last vestiges of the Morgenthau Plan and to fewer war reparations imposed on West Germany (see also Wirtschaftswunder). After lobbying by the Joint Chiefs of Staff, and Generals Clay and Marshall, the Truman administration realized that economic recovery in Europe could not go forward without the reconstruction of the German industrial base on which it previously had been dependent.
In July 1947, President Harry S. Truman rescinded on "national security grounds" the punitive JCS 1067, which had directed the U.S. forces of occupation in Germany to "take no steps looking toward the economic rehabilitation of Germany." It was replaced by JCS 1779, which instead stressed that "[a]n orderly, prosperous Europe requires the economic contributions of a stable and productive Germany."

The dismantling of factories in the western zones, for further transport to the Soviet Union as reparations, was in time halted as frictions grew between East and West. Limits were placed on permitted levels of German production in order to prevent resurgence of German militarism, part of which included severely restricting German steel production and affected the rest of the German economy very negatively (see "The industrial plans for Germany"). Dismantling of factories by France and Great Britain as reparations and for the purpose of lowering German war and economic potential under the  "level of industry plans" took place (halted in 1951), but to nowhere near the scale of the dismantling and transport to the Soviet Union of factories in the eastern zone of occupation. The Eastern Bloc did not accept the Marshall Plan, denouncing it as American economic imperialism, and thus it (East Germany included) recovered much more slowly than their Western counterparts. German political and economic control of the Ruhr area was for a time under international control: the International Authority for the Ruhr (IAR) was created as part of the agreement negotiated at the London Six-Power Conference in June 1948 to establish the Federal Republic of Germany.  In the end, German control of the Ruhr was restored, with the start of the Cold War and the establishment of the European Coal and Steel Community (ECSC). The ECSC led to the pooling of German coal and steel markets within a multinational community in 1951. The neighboring Saar area, containing much of Germany's remaining coal deposits, handed over by the U. S. to French economic administration as a protectorate in 1947 and did not politically return to Germany until January 1957, with economic reintegration occurring a few years later. Upper Silesia, Germany's second largest center of mining and industry, had been handed over to Poland at the Potsdam Conference.

The Allies confiscated intellectual property of great value, all German patents, both in Germany and abroad, and used them to strengthen their own industrial competitiveness by licensing them to Allied companies. Beginning immediately after the German surrender and continuing for the next two years the U.S. pursued a vigorous program to harvest all technological and scientific know-how as well as all patents in Germany. John Gimbel comes to the conclusion, in his book Science Technology and Reparations: Exploitation and Plunder in Postwar Germany, that the "intellectual reparations" taken by the U.S. and the UK amounted to close to $10 billion. During the more than two years that this policy was in place, no industrial research in Germany could take place, as any results would have been automatically available to overseas competitors who were encouraged by the occupation authorities to access all records and facilities. Meanwhile, thousands of the best German researchers were being put to work in the Soviet Union and in the U.S. (see also Operation Paperclip)

For several years following the surrender German nutritional levels were very low, resulting in very high mortality rates. Throughout all of 1945 the U.S. forces of occupation ensured that no international aid reached ethnic Germans. It was directed that all relief went to non-German displaced persons, liberated Allied POWs, and concentration camp inmates. During 1945 it was estimated that the average German civilian in the US and UK occupation zones received 1200 calories a day. Meanwhile, non-German displaced persons were receiving 2300 calories through emergency food imports and Red Cross help. In early October 1945 the UK government privately acknowledged in a cabinet meeting that German civilian adult death rates had risen to 4 times the pre-war levels and death rates amongst the German children had risen by 10 times the pre-war levels. The German Red Cross was dissolved, and the International Red Cross and the few other allowed international relief agencies were kept from helping Germans through strict controls on supplies and travel. The few agencies permitted to help Germans, such as the indigenous Caritasverband, were not allowed to use imported supplies. When the Vatican attempted to transmit food supplies from Chile to German infants the US State Department forbade it. The German food situation reached its worst during the very cold winter of 1946–1947 when German calorie intake ranged from 1,000–1,500 calories per day, a situation made worse by severe lack of fuel for heating. Meanwhile, the Allies were well fed, average adult calorie intake was; U.S. 3200–3300; UK 2900; U.S. Army 4000. German infant mortality rate was twice that of other nations in Western Europe until the close of 1948.

As agreed by the Allies at the Yalta conference Germans were used as forced labor as part of the reparations to be extracted to the countries ruined by Nazi aggression. By 1947 it is estimated that 4,000,000 Germans (both civilians and POWs) were being used as forced labor by the U.S., France, the UK and the Soviet Union. German prisoners were for example forced to clear minefields in France and the low countries. By December 1945 it was estimated by French authorities that 2,000 German prisoners were being killed or maimed each month in accidents. In Norway the last available casualty record, from 29 August 1945, shows that by that time a total of 275 German soldiers died while clearing mines, while 392 had been maimed. Death rates for the German civilians doing forced labor in the Soviet Union ranged between 19% and 39%, depending on category. (see also Forced labor of Germans in the Soviet Union).

Norman Naimark writes in The Russians in Germany: A History of the Soviet Zone of Occupation, 1945–1949, that although the exact number of women and girls who were raped by members of the Red Army in the months preceding and years following the capitulation will never be known, their numbers are likely in the hundreds of thousands, quite possibly as high as the 2,000,000 victims estimate made by Barbara Johr, in Befreier und Befreite. Many of these victims were raped repeatedly. Naimark states that not only had each victim to carry the trauma with her for the rest of her days, it inflicted a massive collective trauma on the East German nation (the German Democratic Republic). Naimark concludes "The social psychology of women and men in the soviet zone of occupation was marked by the crime of rape from the first days of occupation, through the founding of the GDR in the fall of 1949, until – one could argue – the present."

The post-war hostility shown to the German people is exemplified in the fate of the War children, sired by German soldiers with women from the local population in nations such as Norway where the children and their mothers after the war had to endure many years of abuse. In the case of Denmark the hostility felt towards all things German also showed itself in the treatment of German refugees during the years 1945 to 1949. During 1945 alone 7000 German children under the age of 5 died as a result of being denied sufficient food and denied medical attention by Danish doctors who were afraid that rendering aid to the children of the former enemy would be seen as an unpatriotic act. Many children died of easily treatable ailments. As a consequence "more German refugees died in Danish camps, "than Danes did during the entire war.""

During the Cold War, it was difficult for West Germans to visit East German relatives and friends and impossible vice versa. For East Germans, especially after the building of the Berlin Wall on 13 August 1961 and until Hungary opened up its border to the West in the late 1980s, thus allowing hundreds of thousands of vacationing East Germans to flee into Western Europe, it was only possible to get to West Germany by illegally fleeing across heavily fortified and guarded border areas.

44 years after the end of World War II, the Berlin Wall fell on 9 November 1989. The East and West parts of Germany were reunited on 3 October 1990.

Economic and social divisions between East and West Germany continue to play a major role in politics and society in Germany at present. It is likely the contrast between the generally well-off and economically diverse West and the weaker, heavy-industry reliant East will continue at least into the foreseeable future.

See also
 Berlin Wall
 Cold War
 German reunification
 Germany
 East Germany
 West Germany
 History of Germany since 1945
 Marshall Plan
 Ostpolitik

World politics

The war led to the discrediting and dissolution of the League of Nations and to the founding of the United Nations (UN) on 24 October 1945. Like its predecessor, the UN was established to help prevent world wars and contain or stop smaller conflicts. The principles enshrined in the Charter of the United Nations are a testament to the world's attitudes at the defeat of Nazi Germany. Geopolitically, the United States and the Soviet Union emerged as the two new dominant rivaling superpowers. Consequently, two blocks around the USA and the USSR formed. The rivalry caused the Cold War and led to several proxy conflicts. Briefly, before its final decline as a superpower, Great Britain also counted to the "Big Three", a term used to refer to the world's major global powers (the US, USSR and Britain at the time).

International law

The effect the Nazis had on present-day international law was substantial. The United Nations Genocide Convention, a series of laws that made genocide a crime, was approved in December 1948, three years after the Nazi defeat. That same month, the Universal Declaration of Human Rights also became a part of international law. The Nuremberg trials, followed by other Nazi war crimes trials, also created an unwritten rule stating that government officials who "follow orders" from leaders in committing crimes against humanity cannot use such a motive to excuse their crimes. It also had an effect through the Fourth Geneva Convention (Art 33) in making collective punishments a war crime.

Racism

After the world viewed the Nazi death camps, many Western people began to outwardly oppose ideas of racial superiority. Liberal anti-racism became a staple of many Western governments, with openly racist publications looked down upon. The move towards tolerance of different cultures in Western societies has continued to the present day. Since the collapse of Nazi Germany, Western populations have been wary of racial political parties and have actively discouraged white ethnocentrism, fearing the return of a catastrophe similar to the purges carried out by Nazis in Germany. On the other hand, it can be argued that the conception of multiculturalism as one of the pillars of contemporary Western society has gained importance because of the same reaction. The actions of the Nazis caused an increase in anti-German sentiment.

Military

German military doctrine under the Nazi regime, characterized with some controversy as blitzkrieg, called for air strikes that softened an intended victim for attack by motorized, mechanized, and airborne forces on the schwerpunkt (focal point), followed by encirclement by motorized forces, and exploitation of the gap by conventional infantry forces. Radio communication allowed for the close coordination necessary for such attacks, and allowed for coordination of the air force. The Nazis as much broke the rules of engagement which previously governed nations at war (such violations often deemed after the war as crimes against peace) as they innovated techniques of war. Axis reverses beginning with Allied routs of overextended German forces in El Alamein and Stalingrad resulted from British and Soviet forces adopting Nazi field strategies, and as the United States became a participant in the war it adopted much the same techniques of aerial attack upon Nazi Germany, if with greater force than the Luftwaffe could ever inflict.

As Nazi Germany faced severe defeat after the Battle of Kursk and especially the cross-channel invasion it introduced cross-channel use of the V-1 flying bomb and V-2 rocket, although too late and too ineffectively to turn the war to its advantage. The German military machine was developing jet aircraft as fighters and bombers and long-range missiles, but far too late (they were only in the design and test stages) to change the outcome of the war.  The victorious Allies would incorporate the early innovations of jet technology and long-distance rocket-based missiles into their armed forces, but only after the end of World War II after getting them beyond the developmental stages of design and testing.

References
Steven Bela Vardy and T. Hunt Tooley, eds. Ethnic Cleansing in Twentieth-Century Europe . subsection by Richard Dominic Wiggers, The United States and the Refusal to Feed German Civilians after World War II

Footnotes

Nazism
Aftermath of World War II